A switch virtual interface (SVI) represents a logical layer-3 interface on a switch. 

VLANs divide broadcast domains in a LAN environment. Whenever hosts in one VLAN need to communicate with hosts in another VLAN, the traffic must be routed between them. This is known as inter-VLAN routing. On layer-3 switches it is accomplished by the creation of layer-3 interfaces (SVIs). Inter VLAN routing, in other words routing between VLANs, can be achieved using SVIs. 

SVI or VLAN interface, is a virtual routed interface that connects a VLAN on the device to the Layer 3 router engine on the same device. Only one VLAN interface can be associated with a VLAN, but you need to configure a VLAN interface for a VLAN only when you want to route between VLANs or to provide IP host connectivity to the device through a virtual routing and forwarding (VRF) instance that is not the management VRF. When you enable VLAN interface creation, a switch creates a VLAN interface for the default VLAN (VLAN 1) to permit remote switch administration. 

SVIs are generally configured for a VLAN for the following reasons:
 Allow traffic to be routed between VLANs by providing a default gateway for the VLAN.
 Provide fallback bridging (if required for non-routable protocols).
 Provide Layer 3 IP connectivity to the switch.
 Support bridging configurations and routing protocol.
 Access Layer - 'Routed Access' Configuration (in lieu of Spanning Tree)

SVIs advantages include:
 Much faster than router-on-a-stick, because everything is hardware-switched and routed.
 No need for external links from the switch to the router for routing.
 Not limited to one link. Layer 2 EtherChannels can be used between the switches to get more bandwidth.
 Latency is much lower, because it does not need to leave the switch

An SVI can also be known as a Routed VLAN Interface (RVI) by some vendors.

References
 Cisco Systems, Configure InterVLAN Routing on Layer 3 Switches
Cisco Systems, Configuring SVI
Cisco Systems, 2006, "Building Cisco Multilayer Switched Networks" (Version 3.0), Cisco Systems Inc.
Switch Virtual Interfaces (SVI) configuration

 Data Centre Networking Module (COMH9003) | Cork Institute of Technology

Computer networking